Jeppe Bruus Christensen (born 20 April 1978 in Tølløse) is a Danish politician, who is a member of the Folketing for the Social Democrats political party. He was elected into parliament at the 2019 Danish general election. He was previously a member of parliament between 2014 and 2015.

Political career
Bruus first ran for parliament in the 2011 election, where he received 2,706 votes. While not enough for a seat in parliament, it made him the Social Democrats' primary substitute in the Greater Copenhagen constituency. During the 2011-2015 term he was a temporary member of the Folketing, acting as substitute for Sophie Hæstorp Andersen from 5 November 2013 to 3 December 2013. When Sophie Hæstorp Andersen was elected as chairman of the Capital Region of Denmark in the 2013 local election, she resigned her seat. As the party's primary substitute of the constituency, Bruus took over the seat and completed the remainder of the term.

Bruus ran again in the 2015 election. He received 2,806 votes and again became the Social Democrats' primary substitute of the constituency. During the 2015-2019 term he was a substitute for Mogens Lykketoft from 4 July 2015 to 30 September 2016. In the 2019 election Bruus was finally elected into parliament, receiving 4,397 votes and winning a district seat.

External links 
 Biography on the website of the Danish Parliament (Folketinget)

References 

Living people
1978 births
People from Holbæk Municipality
Social Democrats (Denmark) politicians
Members of the Folketing 2011–2015
Members of the Folketing 2019–2022
Members of the Folketing 2022–2026